Bert Jones (born 1951) is an American football quarterback.

Bert Jones may also refer to:

Bert Jones (footballer), see Ivor Jones
Bert Jones (politician) (born 1962), politician in the North Carolina General Assembly
Bert Jones (public servant) (died 1977), Australian public servant
Bert Jones (rugby) (1906–1982), Welsh rugby union and rugby league player

See also
Bertram Jones (disambiguation)
Albert Jones (disambiguation)
Herbert Jones (disambiguation)
Robert Jones (disambiguation)
Hubert Jones (disambiguation)